Enhydra macrodonta, the large-toothed sea otter, is an extinct mustelid known from the middle Pleistocene in California.

Description
The large-toothed sea otter is a close relative of the living sea otter. As its name implies, it is distinguishable from the modern sea otter by its larger, more robust teeth.

Fossils of the large-toothed sea otter are dated to between 700 and 500 ka.

References

Otters
Prehistoric mustelids
Pleistocene carnivorans
Prehistoric mammals of North America
Pleistocene mammals of North America
Mustelidae
Pleistocene extinctions